Victoria Street railway station is a railway station on the Transperth network. It is located on the Fremantle line, 14.2 kilometres from Perth station serving the suburbs of Mosman Park and Cottesloe.

History
Victoria Street station opened in 1954. It closed on 1 September 1979 along with the rest of the Fremantle line, re-opening on 29 July 1983 when services were restored. To the west of the station, a now lifted freight line ran from Cottesloe to the Leighton Marshalling Yard.

Services
Victoria Street station is served by Transperth Fremantle line services from Fremantle to Perth that continue through to Midland via the Midland line.

Victoria Street station saw 150,070 passengers in the 2013–14 financial year.

Platforms

Bus routes

References

Cottesloe, Western Australia
Fremantle line
Railway stations in Perth, Western Australia
Railway stations in Australia opened in 1954